Jana Andresíková (2 April 1941 – 19 October 2020) was a Czech actress.

Biography 
Andresíková was born in Kroměříž, and studied acting at the Janáček Academy of Music and Performing Arts in Brno. After graduating in 1964, she went to Prague and obtained her first professional engagement at the Maringotka avant-garde theatre (1964–1966), after which she was a member of the "Divadlo za branou" (Theatre behind the Gate) for two years (1966–1968). From 1969 she left a permanent engagement and worked as a freelance actress.

She played a large number of film and television roles, mainly playing minor characters. Among others, she appeared in the movies ...a pozdravuji vlaštovky (... and I salute the swallows), Kouzelníkův návrat (The Magician's Return), Kukačka v temném lese (Cuckoo in the Dark Forest). She starred as Queen Elizabeth of Bohemia and starred in the TV movie The Last Queen (1975).

Among her best-known roles was the witch in the series Arabela (1979–1981). Due to serious injuries caused by a traffic accident at the time, she was unable to participate in post-production, so she was dubbed in this role by Jana Dítětová. In the second series she appeared as the mysterious Mrs. Černá.

Andresíková also worked as voice actor; among others, she dubbed Whoopi Goldberg in Sister Act, and in 2010 she was awarded the František Filipovský Prize for her dubbing career. Her last film role was the deranged Lejdy in Zdeněk Troška’s movies Kameňák and Kameňák 3.

Jana Andresíková taught at Theatre Faculty of the Academy of Performing Arts in Prague and at the Private Acting School in Prague.

She died in Mělník, on 19 October 2020, at the age of 79, after long-term illness and COVID-19-related health complications during the COVID-19 pandemic in the Czech Republic.

References

Bibliography 
 Fikejz, Miloš. Český film : herci a herečky. I. díl : A–K. 1. edition. Prague : Libri, 2009. 750 s. . S. 22.

External links
 

Czech actresses
Czech stage actresses
Czech film actresses
Czech television actresses
Czech voice actresses
Janáček Academy of Music and Performing Arts alumni
Deaths from the COVID-19 pandemic in the Czech Republic
1941 births
2020 deaths
People from Kroměříž